The Men's 2009 European Union Amateur Boxing Championships was held at the Odense Sports Centre in Odense, Denmark from June 14 to June 21. The 7th edition of the annual competition was organised by the European governing body for amateur boxing, EABA.

Medal winners

Medal table

External links
 Results

References

2009 European Union Amateur Boxing Championships
European Union Amateur Boxing Championships
2009 European Union Amateur Boxing Championships
European Union Amateur Boxing Championships